Akhethetep was an ancient Egyptian official of the Old Kingdom, who is known from his burial at Giza, excavated 1929–30 by the Egyptian Egyptologist Selim Hassan. Akhethetep had several rather modest titles, including ka-priest of the king's mother, scribe of the treasury or inspector of the scribes of the granary. He was also inspector of scribes at Akhet-Khufu. Akhet-Khufu is the pyramid of king Khufu. His wife was a woman called Nikauhathor. In his tomb are also mentioned on a false door a certain Kainefer and a woman called Peseshet. The latter with the title overseer of the physicians, perhaps the first female doctor known by name. The relationship of these two people to Akhethetep is unknown. Selim Hassan wonders whether they were his parents.

Akhethetep was buried in a mastaba, that was partly carved into the rocks, partly built of stones. Only some parts of the inner rooms were decorated and inscribed.

The exact dating of Akhethetep is uncertain.

References 

Ancient Egyptian scribes
People of the Fifth Dynasty of Egypt